Unforgettable is the seventh solo album by Leroy Hutson.

Track listing
All tracks composed by Alton Littles, Jr.; except where indicated
 "Unforgettable" (Irving Gordon)
 "(You Put the) Funk in My Life"
 "Right or Wrong" (Leroy Hutson, Nate Hutson)
 "So Nice"
 "Lonely Without You" (Leroy Hutson, Nate Hutson)
 "More Where That Came From"

Personnel
Leroy Hutson - vocals
David Wolter, Joe Daniels, Ross Traut - guitar
Keni Burke, Tony Brown - bass
Calvin Bridges, Eric Hackett, Lonnie Reaves - keyboards
Eric Hackett, Tim Tobias - synthesizer
Chester Thompson, Wayne Stewart - drums
Gil Askey, Tyrone "Rock" Deadrick - percussion
Jerry Wilson (tracks: 5), Kenny Soderblom (tracks: 3, 4) - saxophone
Alfonso Surrett, Alton Littles, Jr., Calvin Bridges, "Day" Askey Burke, Martin Dumas, Myrna Postel, Nate Hutson, Roz Thompson - background vocals
Gil Askey - arrangements
Elliot Gordon - photography

Chart positions

Singles

References 

1979 albums
Leroy Hutson albums
Albums produced by Gil Askey
Curtom Records albums
RSO Records albums